Juliet Linda Harmer (born 11 May 1941) is an English artist, children's author and actress who was best known in the role of Georgina Jones in the BBC TV series Adam Adamant Lives! (1966–67).

Early career 
Juliet Harmer trained as a Primary school teacher specialising in Art. After leaving college, she taught for two years before becoming a presenter in BBC schools television.

She returned to painting and working with children when her first daughter was born, and she moved to the Cotswolds in 1970.

Harmer had originally wanted to become a botanist; her great uncle, Sir Sidney Frederic Harmer, had been the director of the Natural History Museum in London, and her father and grandfather, both surgeons, had encouraged her early interest in Natural History. However, after an early career as an actress, principally on television, Harmer chose to stay at home with her children and write and illustrate children's books.

Her work has been described by her editor at Egmont Children's Books, as having "an almost melodic simplicity", and an article in the Stroud News and Journal referred to its "jewel-like intensity". She says of her work: "My inspiration comes from nature, particularly from Gloucestershire, where I live, and Cornwall where the family have had many holidays. I paint what makes me happy. These fleeting moments are so precious- perhaps painting is a way of capturing them. Perhaps I also paint to compensate for a feeling of loss- the loss of innocence, the loss of childhood, and the increasing loss of our beautiful English countryside".

Harmer has written and illustrated several books, including four for children and an illuminated manuscript celebrating the healing properties of herbs and flowers.

She has exhibited her work in Gloucestershire and London and many of her paintings are in private collections in Paris, London, New York and Sydney.

Film and television 

Harmer's television career began with appearances in  series such as Emergency – Ward 10, Danger Man and Marriage Lines. She played Jill Manson, the nominal headmistress of a deserted school in the village of Little Bazeley-on-Sea in the opening episode of the fourth series of The Avengers (ABC, 1965), in which Diana Rigg appeared for the first time as Emma Peel. Towards the end of the episode the two women engaged in a memorable fight.

Harmer featured in Michael Gill's short film, The Peaches (1964), a fantasy about a beautiful young woman's sensual passion for peaches written by Gill's wife, Yvonne Gilan, which was shown at the Cannes Film Festival in 1964.

Adam Adamant Lives! 

The original choice for the role of Georgina Jones in Adam Adamant had been Ann Holloway (later Karen Glover in the comedy series Father, Dear Father), who played the part in an untransmitted pilot in April 1966. However, Holloway's performance was deemed "not to fit the series" and Harmer was cast at short notice from some 300 applicants. She did not even have a screen test and admitted over twenty years later that she had answered affirmatively when asked if she could ride a motor scooter whereas, in fact, she could not.

Georgina Jones 
Georgina Jones was a trendy Mod who dressed in the fashionable styles of the mid 1960s. She befriended Adam Adamant, an Edwardian adventurer, played by Gerald Harper, who had been frozen in time in 1902. His return to life in "Swinging London" was the signal for a succession of new adventures, in which Georgina, whom Adamant habitually referred to as "Miss Jones" and  failed initially to comprehend, was usually in tow. As Harper put it in 2006, "if you have Adam Adamant from 1902 presented to Georgina who is wearing a mini-skirt which to him is appalling, you immediately have a confrontation and it's amusing".

In an interview with Russell Twisk for the Radio Times in August 1966, Harmer was described as "the Girl from Adam Adamant" (rather as Stefanie Powers was, later that year, The Girl from U.N.C.L.E.) The article emphasised that Harmer sometimes used clothes from her own wardrobe for the part of Georgina Jones, thus pitching her as a trend setter in her own right. Harmer reflected in 2006 that most of her fan mail had been from 14- or 15-year-old boys.

Adam Adamant in retrospect 
There were 29 episodes of Adam Adamant, spread over two series (1966–67) but, although the show was produced by Verity Lambert, it did not achieve the ratings, critical success or overseas sales for which the BBC had hoped. Lambert regarded it in retrospect as a failure, while reflecting that it had possessed essentially all the same ingredients as the highly successful The Avengers. A third series was considered, but never commissioned.

Harper recalled Harmer as "a kooky, curious girl, but utterly beautiful and very nice". The two met again at Pinewood Studios forty years later as part of a documentary film  to accompany the release on DVD of the 17 surviving episodes of Adam Adamant.

Acting roles in late 1960s and 70s 
After Adam Adamant, Harmer appeared in episodes of other television series, including Department S (1969–70), Randall and Hopkirk (Deceased) (1970), The Persuaders! (1971) (as a briefly recurring character named Prue), Bless This House (1971) and Jason King (1972), a "spin off" of Department S. Films included Quest for Love (1971), a science-fiction romance based on a story by John Wyndham, Home Before Midnight (1979), and Paris by Night (1988). She also acted in Carry on Matron (1972) but her scenes were cut from the finished film. In 1969 Harmer appeared as Stevie in Slim John, an English language instructional serial made by the BBC for overseas broadcast.

Personal life 
Harmer married actor William Squire (1917–89) in 1967., It was his second marriage and they later divorced. Since 1977, she has been married to theatre director Bill Alexander. They have two daughters, Jess and Lola, and two grandchildren, Vinny and Thea.

Filmography 
 The Peaches (1964) - The Girl
 Up Jumped a Swagman (1965) - Second London Girl
 Just like a Woman (1967) - Lewis's Girlfriend
 Quest for Love (1971) - Geraldine Lambert
 Home Before Midnight (1979) - Susan Wilshire 
 Paris by Night (1988) - Delia

Children's books 

Juliet Harmer's children's books include:
 The Little Go To Sleep Book
 The Rocking Horse
 Sophie's Little Angel
 Prayers For Children
 The Magic of Herbs and Flowers

In 2003 she was highly commended in the BBC Christmas Card Wildlife competition.

Painting 
Her paintings have been exhibited in Gloucestershire and London. Galleries include:
 The Art Gallery, Long Street, Tetbury
 Royal Society of British Artists, London
 Cheltenham Art Gallery & Museum
 The Coln Gallery Cirencester
 Leighton House Kensington
and most recently,
 Gallery 54, Shepherd Market, Mayfair, London

References

External links 

 

1941 births
Living people
English film actresses
English television actresses
English children's writers
English women painters
20th-century English actresses
20th-century English writers
21st-century British women artists
21st-century English women
21st-century English people